Mayor of the Town either refers to:
 Mayor of the Town (radio program), a comedy–drama radio show
 Mayor of the Town (TV series), a television series based on the aforementioned radio program